Hotel Transylvania: The Series is an animated comedy television series produced by Sony Pictures Animation and Nelvana in association with Corus Entertainment. It is based on and serves as a prequel to the film Hotel Transylvania (2012), taking place in 2008, four years before the events of the first film, focusing on the activities of 114/115-year-old Mavis and her best friends at the Hotel Transylvania while Dracula is away at the Vampire Council.

The 26-episode first season premiered on June 25, 2017, on Disney Channel in the United States, with the first episode released earlier on June 20, 2017, on the WATCH Disney Channel app, YouTube, and VOD. The last eight episodes of the first season were first streamed onto Netflix in the United States on June 25, 2018, prior to their television air dates. In Canada, the series premiered October 2, 2017, on Teletoon.

On September 12, 2018, a second season was announced. The second and final season premiered on October 8, 2019 and ran through October 29, 2020.

The series has currently not been released on DVD or any home media format.

Premise
The series takes place in 2008, four years before the original CGI film and follows Mavis and her best friends as they have fun adventures at the hotel while Dracula is away on business with the Vampire Council.

Characters

Main
 Mavis Dracula (voiced by Bryn McAuley) is the carefree 114-year-old daughter of the late Martha and Dracula, who wants to have fun with her best friends. Her boundless curiosity and carefree spirit frequently leads her into trouble with her aunt Lydia. She turns 115 in the Season 1 finale "Fangcenera" and earns her own family cape. She is a lot paler than in the movies.
 Wendy Blob (voiced by Evany Rosen) is a green blob of goo that is the daughter of Blobby and is one of Mavis' friends.
 Hank N. Stein (voiced by Gage Munroe) is the teen aged son of Frankenstein and Eunice and is one of Mavis' best friends. In "Thumb and Thumber" it is revealed that he has Dracula ancestry, making him and Mavis paternal distant cousins. 
 Pedro (voiced by Joseph Motiki) is a fat teenage mummy who resembles Murray and is one of Mavis' friends. Pedro enjoys eating, sleeping, and rapping. His hero is the Sandman. He finally learns how to lay curses properly in "Purse of the Mummy."
 Aunt Lydia Dracula (voiced by Dan Chameroy) is Dracula's older sister, the late Martha's sister-in-law, and Mavis' paternal aunt, who pushes more order and tradition at the hotel when Mavis and her friends want to have any kind of fun. Her true name is revealed in "The Naming of the Shew."
 Diane (voiced by Richard Binsley) is Aunt Lydia's pet chicken who used to be a human woman. She acts as Lydia's eyes and ears throughout the hotel. Her original form as a mortal has yet to be revealed.

Recurring
 Count "Drac" Dracula (voiced by David Berni in season one, Ivan Sherry in season two) is Mavis' widowed overprotective father and is away on "official vampire business" at the Vampire Council. He is replaced by his elder sister Lydia as the head staff of the hotel until his return. His cape is tinted purple instead of blood-red. In the Season 2 finale "What Lycidias Beneath", he decides to stay at the Hotel for good as he senses there are more dangers going in the Underworld.
 Frank N. Stein (voiced by Paul Braunstein) is the father of Hank N. Stein and husband of Eunice.
 Eunice is the mother of Hank N. Stein and wife of Frank.
 Quasimodo (voiced by Christopher Jacot) is Hotel Tranyslvania's residential chef.
 Uncle Gene Dracula (voiced by Patrick McKenna) is Mavis' uncle and Dracula and Lydia's younger brother who enjoys playing video games. He stays in a chariot-like wheelchair.
 Dr. John Gillman is a gill-man who is Hotel Transylvania's residential physician.
 Donald (voiced by Ryan Belleville) and Kitty Cartwright (voiced by Linda Kash) are a couple of humans who live with their toddler daughter near Hotel Transylvania. Donald is the fun and dim-witted father and Kitty is the overprotective mother who does anything to keep monsters away from her house, including installing the house with a high tech security system.
 Cerberus is a three-headed guard dog that mostly resides in Hotel Transylvania's Cerberus Pit.
 Klaus (voiced by Carter Hayden) is Mavis' first cousin who is always trying to beat and best her in everything else except turning into a bat, a natural ability he finally develops in "Drop the Needle". His name is pronounced "Klow-shh." He is least liked by his uncle and other vampires who consider him annoying and dim-witted.

Supporting
Countess Martha was Count Dracula's beloved wife who was a vampire as well. She does not actually appear, having been killed by an angry mob centuries before the events of the show and movies, but is referenced in "Fangcenera" when her husband gives Mavis her blood-red gown as a one hundred-and-fifteenth birthday present.

Production
Hotel Transylvania: The Series''' voice cast is based in Toronto, Ontario, Canada, with the Dayton/Walters casting agency being responsible for the casting. None of the original cast returned for the show.

Episodes

Broadcast
Sony Pictures Animation licensed Hotel Transylvania: The Series for platforms in Africa, Asia, Australia and New Zealand, Europe (excluding Germany), Latin America, the Middle East, and the United States. Sony Pictures Television is the distributor in the United States, while Nelvana Enterprises, successor of Nelvana International, is the distributor of the Hotel Transylvania: The Series'' internationally. The series debuted on Teletoon in Fall 2017 in Canada. In India, the series premiered on December 18, 2017, on Disney Channel India. The series was shown in Germany by Super RTL in 2018 and also on CITV in the UK the same year. Repeats of the series started airing on Disney XD in the United States as of October 2019. The last eight episodes of the first season were shown on Netflix in the United States on June 25, 2018, a year after the show premiered.

References

External links

 Official website  at Corus Entertainment
 Official website at Sony Pictures Animation
 

Hotel Transylvania
2010s American animated television series
2020s American animated television series
2017 American television series debuts
2020 American television series endings
2010s Canadian animated television series
2020s Canadian animated television series
2017 Canadian television series debuts
2020 Canadian television series endings
Television series set in 2008
American children's animated comedy television series
American children's animated fantasy television series
American children's animated horror television series
American children's animated musical television series
American prequel television series
Canadian children's animated comedy television series
Canadian children's animated fantasy television series
Canadian children's animated horror television series
Canadian children's animated musical television series
Disney Channel original programming
Teletoon original programming
English-language television shows
Animated television shows based on films
Television series by Nelvana
Television series by Sony Pictures Animation
Television series by Corus Entertainment
Television series set in hotels
Vampires in animated television
Santa Claus in television
Sandman in television
Television about Bigfoot
Animated television about werewolves
Television series about personifications of death